Carl Grahn (born January 8, 1981) is a Finnish former professional ice hockey goaltender. He was selected by the  Los Angeles Kings in the 9th round (282nd overall) of the 2000 NHL Entry Draft.

Grahn played 24 games in the SM-liiga with KalPa and the Lahti Pelicans.

References

External links

1981 births
Living people
Finnish ice hockey goaltenders
KalPa players
Lahti Pelicans players
Los Angeles Kings draft picks